Equiaxed crystals are crystals that have axes of approximately the same length.  

Equiaxed grains can in some cases be an indication for recrystallization.

Equiaxed crystals can be achieved by heat treatment, namely annealing and normalizing.

Note

  According to Mabuchi, Yamada et al. in "The grain size dependence of strength in the extruded AZ91 M alloy",  in "Magnesium Alloys and their Applications", edited by K.U. Kainer (2000), 

Crystals